"Rocky" is a song written by Ronald Johnson (aka Woody P. Snow) and performed by American country music artist Dickey Lee.  It was released in July 1975 as the fifth single and title track from the album Rocky.  On the country chart, "Rocky" was Lee's most successful single, and his only number one.  It spent fourteen weeks on the chart, including one week at number one.

Content
In a paradoxically upbeat melody in a major key, Rocky, the title protagonist, tells the tragic story of his young wife in first person. He first recalls the day four years earlier where, as an 18-year-old college student, he met his wife-to-be (unnamed in the song) and recalls how well they hit it off. She accepts Rocky's marriage proposal, and they spend the next several months fixing up an old house to make their home. The two soon learn they are expecting their first child, a girl.

Although the family has its usual problems, the happy memories outweigh the bad. One example is a particularly rambunctious first birthday party for the couple's daughter. With things going well and the family settling in on a content life, Rocky soon gets devastating news: his wife has been diagnosed with an apparently inoperable illness — the specific illness is unidentified in the song — and that she has only a short time to live.

All of this is told in flashback, as in the final verse, his young wife has died. Rocky is now a widower and raising his daughter alone. He feels a sense of sadness every time he looks at his daughter, who strongly resembles her mother, and now doing the same things alone that he once did with his wife. However, he feels a sense of hope, with his wife looking down on him and the couple's daughter and reassures that his love for her will always remain safe.

Each of the first three verses — telling one of the chapters in the couple's life — ends with the woman having a sense of fear of the unknown, expressed through the refrain's statement, "Rocky, I've never…," followed by the appropriate follow-up ("been in love before," "had a baby before," "had to die before") and the unassured, "Don't know if I can do it."  However, both he and she realize that the strength they have in each other can help them meet each challenge head on.  At the end, Rocky says that "if the world would end, your love is safe with me."  The fourth refrain has Rocky envisioning hearing his deceased wife reassure, "Rocky, you know that you've been alone before, you know that you can do it," and that in her own way, she can still advise him in his time of need.

Chart performance

Dickey Lee version

Austin Roberts recording
Also, in 1975, Austin Roberts recorded a version which reached number 9 on the U.S. Billboard Hot 100 and number 10 in Canada in 1975.  The track reached #22 in the UK Singles Chart in November 1975; Roberts' only chart appearance in the UK.

Austin Roberts version

Weekly charts

Year-end charts

Cover versions
in 1979, Jimmy "Orion" Ellis recorded his version.
The song had been translated into Dutch; Don Mercedes hit #1 in June 1976, in the Nederlandse Top 40.
A German version had been recorded by Frank Farian, hitting the German (#1 for four weeks) and Dutch Top 10s.

References

1975 singles
Dickey Lee songs
Austin Roberts (singer) songs
Number-one singles in Germany
Number-one singles in South Africa
Song recordings produced by Allen Reynolds
RCA Records singles
1975 songs
Private Stock Records singles
Song recordings produced by Bob Montgomery (songwriter)